Dillon Cone is a hill in the south Marlborough region of the country of New Zealand with an elevation of  above sea level. It is the 24th highest mountain in Marlborough and the 439th highest mountain in New Zealand.

References

Geography of the Marlborough Region
Hills of New Zealand